A Three Shire Stone is a monument marking the point where three shires meet. The term is mostly used in England.

Some notable Three Shire landmarks are:

Three Shire Stone (Lake District) – Cumberland/Lancashire/Westmorland
Three Shire Stone – Bedfordshire/Huntingdonshire/Northamptonshire 
Three Shire Stones (Bath and North East Somerset) – Somerset/Gloucestershire/Wiltshire (also the site of a neolithic burial chamber)
Three Shire Stones – Northamptonshire/Oxfordshire/Warwickshire: site of three marker stones until World War II, now part of Three Shire Farm
Three Shires Oak – Derbyshire/Nottinghamshire/Yorkshire, 500m south of actual county tripoint
Three Shire Oak – Leicestershire/Lincolnshire/Nottinghamshire
Three Shires Oak – Staffordshire/Shropshire/Worcestershire: 19th-century meeting point of Staffordshire with detached parts of Shropshire and Worcestershire; cut down in 1904, commemorated in name of current road
Three Shire Head – Derbyshire/Cheshire/Staffordshire near Flash: also known as Three Shire Stones, the former site of three stones marking the boundary and shown on John Speed's map of 1612
Threeshire Wood – Buckinghamshire/Bedfordshire/Northamptonshire
 Three Counties Road in Mossley, Greater Manchester is situated on the west bank of the River Tame adjacent to the Yorkshire/Lancashire/Cheshire historical tripoint

See also
Tripoint, a point where three counties (or other geographical entities) meet
List of tripoints of English counties, listing ceremonial and historic county tripoints
Three-Farthing Stone in The Shire of J. R. R. Tolkien's legendarium
Quadripoint, a point where four counties (or other geographical entities) meet
No Man's Heath, Warwickshire, possibly having a Four Shire Stone
Four shire stone where Worcestershire, Warwickshire, Oxfordshire and Gloucestershire once met

Border tripoints